= Port au Bras Formation =

- Stratigraphic range: Neoproterozoic
- Type: Formation
- Unit of: Burin Group

Lithology
- Primary: Mafic volcaniclastics

Location
- Region: Newfoundland
- Country: Canada
- Occurrence of the Port au Bras Formation in southeastern Newfoundland

The Port au Bras Formation is a formation cropping out in Newfoundland.
